is a train station located in Yanagawa, Fukuoka.

Lines 
Nishi-Nippon Railroad
Tenjin Ōmuta Line

Platforms

Adjacent stations

Surrounding area
 Toyohara Elementary School
 Toyohara kindergarten
 Toyohara Post Office
 Uchida Clinic
 Japan National Route 208

Railway stations in Fukuoka Prefecture
Railway stations in Japan opened in 1938